Foncea is a municipality of the autonomous community of La Rioja (Spain). It is located in northeast of the province, near to the Montes Obarenes. It depends on the judicial district of Haro.

The first documental mention of Foncea was in 952 in some donations deeds.

Foncea is also a non common Spanish surname which origin is probably  related with the municipality of Foncea, although this relation have not been proved. Persons with this surname lived principally in Spain, Chile and Argentina.

Notable people
 Ángel Casimiro de Govantes, historian.

References

Municipalities in La Rioja (Spain)